WJCC may refer to:

 WJCC (AM), a radio station (1700 AM) licensed to serve Miami Springs, Florida, United States
 World Junior Curling Championships
 Western Joint Computer Conference
 Williamsburg-James City County Public Schools, Virginia